The term or name Dale appears in a number of place names in the American state of Virginia. Unless stated otherwise, a listed place is a town, or unincorporated community.

With "Dale" as a word 
Dale City (despite its name, an unincorporated community)
Locust Dale
Dale Enterprise
Lee Dale Shores

With "dale" as part of another word 
 Troutdale
 Annandale

Former parts of Virginia 
The territory of the present state of West Virginia was without controversy part of Virginia at least until the secession of Virginia in 1861. The following West Virginia places took their current names from those of settlements existing before secession, and may then have already been regarded as named places in Virginia:
 Sycamore Dale, a historic home, pre-existed secession under that name
 Carpendale
 Amherstdale

In contrast, Glen Dale is a city that takes its name from Glen Dale Farm, which as so named by Hannah Jane Cockayne, née Alexander. It is known she was 20 or 21 at the time of West Virginia's secession, and that she married the owner in 1863, so even "Glen Dale Farm, Virginia" may be an anachronistic term. It is clear that what is now the city of Glen Dale was never a city while its location lay in Virginia.

The remaining Dale/-dale-named West Virginia places are:
 Pleasant Dale
 Laurel Dale
 Ben Dale
 Spring Dale
 Quiet Dale